Gas-Oil is a 1955 French crime drama film directed by Gilles Grangier and starring Jean Gabin, Jeanne Moreau, Gaby Basset and Ginette Leclerc. It was shot at the Epinay Studios in Paris and on location at a variety of places. The film's sets were designed by the art director Jacques Colombier. It was one of a number of films portraying tough truck drivers made in the wake of the success of the 1953 film The Wages of Fear. It was the first of many films in which Gabin appeared in written by his fellow Parisian Michel Audiard.

Synopsis
While driving home one night after meeting his girlfriend, trucker Jean Chape encounters a dead body lying in the road. He reports it the police but they suspect that he is responsible.

Cast
 Jean Gabin as 	Jean Chape
 Jeanne Moreau as Alice
 Gaby Basset as 	Camille Serin
 Ginette Leclerc as 	Mme Scoppo
 Simone Berthier as Annie, une serveuse
 Charles Bouillaud as 	Le gendarme dactylographe
 Marcel Bozzuffi as 	Pierrot Ragondin
 Robert Dalban as 	Félix
 Albert Dinan as 	Émile Serin
 Gilbert Edard as 	Un commissaire	
 Camille Guérini as Lucien Ragondin
 Guy Henry as 	Jojo, un routier
 Roger Hanin as 	René Schwob
 Bob Ingarao as Un gangster
 Jean Lefebvre as Le chauffeur de car 
 Lisette Lebon as 	Mauricette, une serveuse
 Jacques Marin as 	Un gendarme au commissariat
 Germaine Michel as 	Maria Ragondin, la mère de Pierrot
 Albert Michel as 	Le facteur
 Marcel Pérès as 	Le barbier
 Jean-Marie Rivière as 	Un gangster
 Henri Crémieux as 	Le premier commissaire

References

Bibliography
 Frey, Hugo. Nationalism and the Cinema in France: Political Mythologies and Film Events, 1945-1995. Berghahn Books,  2014.
 Harriss, Joseph. Jean Gabin: The Actor Who Was France. McFarland, 2018.

External links 
 

1955 films
French crime drama films
1950s French-language films
1953 crime drama films
Films directed by Gilles Grangier
Films shot at Epinay Studios
Films based on French novels
Films with screenplays by Michel Audiard
French black-and-white films
1950s French films